Steve Campbell (born October 22, 1970) is a former professional tennis player from the United States.

Career
Campbell, a New Yorker by birth, grew up in Michigan where he attended Detroit Catholic Central High School winning individual state championships all four years along with back to back team state championships. He was an All-American while at Rice University.

He made his Grand Slam debut at the 1995 Australian Open and defeated countryman Chuck Adams in the opening encounter, before losing his second round match to Patrick Rafter. The American pushed veteran Mats Wilander to five sets in the US Open but he would have to wait until the 1998 Australian Open for his second win. In that tournament he beat both Justin Gimelstob and Alex O'Brien to make it into the third round, his best ever showing in a Grand Slam.

Although predominantly a singles player, Campbell's only ATP Tour final was in the doubles, at Bogota, where he and MaliVai Washington finished runners-up in 1995. He made the singles semi-finals of the 1997 International Tennis Championships but had by far his best performances in 1998. After starting the year well at the Australian Open, Campbell won three matches at the Lipton Championships in Miami (an ATP Super 9 event), reaching the quarter-finals. He was also a quarter-finalist at Atlanta and again in the Heineken Trophy, where he upset world number seven Yevgeny Kafelnikov.

ATP career finals

Doubles: 1 (0–1)

Challenger titles

Singles: (2)

References

1970 births
Living people
American male tennis players
Rice Owls men's tennis players
Tennis people from Michigan
African-American male tennis players
Sportspeople from Detroit
Detroit Catholic Central High School alumni
21st-century African-American sportspeople
20th-century African-American sportspeople